A Fine Mess is the second studio album by American singer-songwriter Kate Voegele. It is a combination of upbeat pop rock music, adding to the sound of her debut album, Don't Look Away (2007).

Background
Voegele first announced plans for a new album in 2008, while promoting her debut album, Don't Look Away. Between this announcement and the album's release, several songs were previewed and released. Three promotional singles were released from the album, including "Angel", "Lift Me Up", and "Sweet Silver Lining". After the album's release, several songs from the album (including those on the album's deluxe edition) managed to chart on several Billboard Bubbling Under Hot 100 in the US.

Promotion
The album was promoted by the Lift Me Up Tour in which Voegele headlined. She also performed songs from the album while opening up for Jordin Sparks on her Battlefield Tour. Several songs from the album were also premiered by Voegele's character Mia Catalano on One Tree Hill.

Track listing

Charts

References

2009 albums
Kate Voegele albums
Albums produced by Mike Elizondo